Gregoritsch is a surname. Notable people with the surname include:

Michael Gregoritsch (born 1994), Austrian footballer
Werner Gregoritsch (born 1958), Austrian football manager